FBA may refer to:

 Federation of British Artists
 Federal Bar Association
 Fellow of the British Academy
 Filsports Basketball Association
 First Baptist Academy (Houston, Texas), United States
 First Baptist Academy of Dallas, Texas, United States
 First Baptist Church (Atlanta), Georgia, United States
 Fixed-block architecture
 Florida Basketball Association
 Flux balance analysis, in chemical engineering/systems biology
 Folke Bernadotte Academy
 Fonte Boa Airport, in Brazil
 Belgian Forces in Germany after the Second World War
 Found Brothers Aviation, Canadian aircraft manufacturer
 Franco-British Aviation, British seaplane manufacturer
 French BasketBall Association
 Freshwater Biological Association
 Functional behavioral assessment
 Fusiform body area
 Fulfillment by Amazon; see Amazon.com § Fulfillment and warehousing
 A component of FVA - one of the  X-Value Adjustments in relation to derivative instruments held by banks